William Joseph Martínez (born José Guillermo Martinez Escalante, 1954) is a Mexican-American attorney serving as a Senior United States district judge of the United States District Court for the District of Colorado.

Early life and education 

Born José Guillermo Martínez Escalante in Mexico City, Martínez moved to the United States with his family as a child and changed his name to William Joseph Martínez in 1974. He grew up in the South Shore community of Chicago and graduated from Lyons Township High School in La Grange, Illinois. Martínez earned a Bachelor of Arts and Bachelor of Science degree from the University of Illinois at Urbana-Champaign in 1977, followed by a Juris Doctor from the University of Chicago Law School in 1980.

Career 

From 1980 until 1984, Martínez served as a staff attorney for the Legal Assistance Foundation of Metropolitan Chicago, and from 1984 until 1987, he served as a staff attorney for the foundation's Employment Law Project. From 1988 until 1992, Martínez served as a senior litigation associate for a Denver law firm. From 1992 until 1996, he served as a Denver-based regional attorney for the United States Equal Employment Opportunity Commission. From 1997 until 2001, Martínez worked as a sole law practitioner in Denver, and from 2001 until 2010 he was a partner at the Denver firm of McNamara & Martínez (later known as McNamara, Roseman, Martínez & Kazmierski), where he specialized in employment and civil rights law.

Federal judicial service 

On February 24, 2010, President Barack Obama nominated Martínez to serve as a United States district judge of the United States District Court for the District of Colorado, to fill the seat that Judge Edward Nottingham vacated in 2008 when he resigned. Martínez was confirmed by the United States Senate on December 21, 2010 by a 58–37 vote. He received his commission the same day. He assumed senior status on February 10, 2023.

See also 
 List of Hispanic/Latino American jurists

References

External links

William J. Martínez District of Colorado

 

1954 births
Living people
20th-century American lawyers
21st-century American judges
21st-century American lawyers
American judges of Mexican descent
American lawyers of Mexican descent
Colorado lawyers
Hispanic and Latino American judges
Illinois lawyers
Judges of the United States District Court for the District of Colorado
People from Colorado
United States district court judges appointed by Barack Obama
University of Chicago Law School alumni
University of Illinois Urbana-Champaign alumni